Parornix micrura is a moth of the family Gracillariidae. It is known from Mexico.

References

Parornix
Moths of Central America
Moths described in 1914